Elroy Alexander Smith (born 30 November 1981) is a Belizean football defender that currently plays for Belmopan Bandits, having previously played for several clubs in Liga Nacional de Honduras.

International career
He made his debut for Belize in a June 2004, FIFA World Cup qualification match against Canada and has, as of July 2011, earned 16 caps, playing in 7 World Cup qualifiers.

International goals
Scores and results list Belize's goal tally first.

Stats

External links

References

1981 births
Living people
Association football defenders
Belizean footballers
Belize international footballers
2005 UNCAF Nations Cup players
2007 UNCAF Nations Cup players
2009 UNCAF Nations Cup players
2011 Copa Centroamericana players
2013 Copa Centroamericana players
2013 CONCACAF Gold Cup players
2014 Copa Centroamericana players
2017 Copa Centroamericana players
New Site Erei players
Wagiya FC players
Deportes Savio players
C.D. Marathón players
C.D.S. Vida players
Platense F.C. players
Belizean expatriate footballers
Expatriate footballers in Honduras
Liga Nacional de Fútbol Profesional de Honduras players
Premier League of Belize players
Belmopan Bandits players